The High School Affiliated to Beijing International Studies University is a public secondary school located in Chaoyang District, Beijing. Founded in 1956, the school is administered by the Education Commission of Chaoyang District and the teaching activities are organised into Junior High (from Year 7 to Year 9) and Senior High (from Year 10 to Year 12). It occupies currently two campuses amounting to ca. 8.65 acres (35,000 m3), featuring 24 Junior and 12 Senior teaching classes.

The High School Affiliated to Beijing International Studies University is not to be confused with another public school in the district, 中国旅游学院附属中学, literally the High School Affiliated to China Tourism Institute. While China Tourism Institute was another name for Beijing International Studies University during the 1980s and 1990s, it is more of a historical term, i.e. a China Tourism Institute does not currently exist in China. In addition, although the school names itself BISU Junior High School in English (according to its website), there is no official link between the school and the university.

History
The school as a whole was officially established in 2000 as a merger of three high schools in the neighbourhood. Its predecessors include Guanzhuang High School and Yangzha High School, both founded in 1956, and the 1983-founded Guanzhuang II High School. Shortly after the establishment, the same year in July, the school was named High School affiliated to China Building Materials Academy. In 2011, it became the affiliated school to Beijing International Studies University under the collaborative agreement between the Chaoyang Education Commission and the University.

Establishment
 
 
 

Transformation
 
 
 

 Recently

See also
 Beijing International Studies University

References

External links
The High School Affiliated to Beijing International Studies University 

Beijing International Studies University
University-affiliated schools in China
High schools in Beijing
1956 establishments in China